Start-Up (also known as Start-Up 2000) is a PC video game in which players must try to build a successful business start-up from venture capitalists to IPO's. Start-Up is published by Monte Cristo and distributed by Electronic Arts.

References

External links 
Electronic Arts
Monte Cristo

2000 video games
Electronic Arts games
North America-exclusive video games
Video games developed in France
Windows games
Windows-only games